Crossocheilus klatti, also known as the Isparta minnow or  Anatolian golden barb, is a species of ray-finned fish in the genus Crossocheilus. It is found in the Lake Işıklı basin in the Büyük Menderes drainage in Turkey. There is some confusion regarding the identity of this fish. This poorly known species is closely related to Garra kemali,  and likely should be placed in that genus.

References

Crossocheilus
Fish described in 1950
Taxobox binomials not recognized by IUCN